The 2018 Gran Piemonte was the 102nd edition of the Gran Piemonte (known as Giro del Piemonte until 2009) single-day cycling race. It was held on 11 October, over a distance of 191 km, starting in Racconigi and ending in Moncalieri.

Teams
Eighteen teams were invited to take part in the race. These included twelve UCI WorldTeams and six UCI Professional Continental teams.

Results

References

Gran Piemonte
2018 in Italian sport
Giro del Piemonte